Robert Wakefield Clarke (1924-1981) was an English cricketer active from 1947 to 1957 who played for Northamptonshire. He appeared in 212 first-class matches as a left arm fast bowler who was a lefthanded batsman. Clarke was born in Finedon, Northamptonshire on 22 April 1924 and died in Sherborne, Dorset on 3 August 1981. He took 484 first-class wickets with a best performance of eight for 26 and he scored 2,745 runs with a highest score of 56, one of six half-centuries.

Notes

Sources
 Robert Clarke at CricketArchive
 Robert Clarke at ESPNcricinfo
 Playfair Cricket Annual – 1948 edition

English cricketers
Northamptonshire cricketers
1924 births
1981 deaths
Marylebone Cricket Club cricketers
North v South cricketers
Devon cricketers
People from Finedon
People from Sherborne
Cricketers from Dorset